"Put Your Hands Where My Eyes Could See" is a hip hop song recorded by American rapper Busta Rhymes. The single serves as the lead single from his second studio album When Disaster Strikes (1997) and its music video is notable for its homage to the 1988 Eddie Murphy film Coming to America. The song contains a sample of the 1976 recording "Sweet Green Fields" by American soft rock duo Seals and Crofts. Rhymes scored a second consecutive nomination for Best Rap Solo Performance at the 40th Grammy Awards.

Chart performance
Despite huge airplay, the song only peaked within the top forty on the US Billboard Hot 100 Airplay chart, where it peaked at number thirty-seven. It was most successful on its component Hot R&B/Hip-Hop Songs chart, where it reached number two. It also charted outside the US, reaching the top 20 on the UK Singles Chart at number 16.

Reception and legacy
In 1999, MTV ranked the video itself at #20 for The 100 Greatest Music Videos Ever Made and VH1 ranked the song at #7 on their list of the 40 Greatest Hip Hop Songs of the 90s. In 2021, Cleveland.com ranked the song as number 110 of the best 200 rap songs, calling it "one of the great miracles of Nineties hip hop."

Music video
The official music video for the song, directed by Hype Williams and designed by Ron Norsworthy, is based on Eddie Murphy's 1988 film Coming to America. According to Busta Rhymes, the inspiration for this idea was the fact that Coming to America was playing on the television in the studio at the time he and the production crew were working on mixing the record.  The film is about an African living in New York City and Busta Rhymes felt that the record had an African sound to it.  At the chorus is a well choreographed dance routine which is followed by Busta running from an elephant and him, along with The Flipmode Squad, in glowing tribal African makeup and outfit. The video debuted on Monday, September 1, 1997 on Totally Pauly on MTV, with Pauly Shore interviewing Rhymes live. The video received heavy rotation on both the MTV and BET networks. The video was filmed at Chambers and Centre Street in Downtown Manhattan — including the main lobby of the Surrogate's Courthouse.

Awards and nominations
"Put Your Hands Where My Eyes Could See" earned Rhymes his second nomination for Best Rap Solo Performance at the 40th Grammy Awards. The award went to "Men in Black" by Will Smith. The music video earned four nominations including Best Male Video and Best Rap Video at the 1998 MTV VMAs. It lost both to Will Smith, respectively, for "Just the Two of Us" and "Gettin' Jiggy wit It".

In other media
This song was also featured on video games True Crime: New York City, Def Jam Rapstar, DJ Hero 2 and NBA 2K18.

Charts

References

1997 singles
1997 songs
Busta Rhymes songs
Songs written by James Seals
Elektra Records singles
Music videos directed by Hype Williams